The Southern California Breakers were a football team in the Independent Women's Football League based in Orange County, California. Home games were played on the campus of Fullerton Union High School.

For their first three seasons, the Breakers were called the Orange County Breakers and played in the National Women's Football Association.

Season-By-Season

|-
| colspan="6" align="center" | Orange County Breakers (NWFA)
|-
|2005 || colspan="6" rowspan="1" align="center" | X-Team: Results Unknown/Not Counted
|-
|2006 || 8 || 0 || 0 || 1st Western Conference || --
|-
|2007 || 5 || 3 || 0 || 2nd Western Conference || --
|-
| colspan="6" align="center" | Southern California Breakers (IWFL)
|-
|2008 || 4 || 4 || 0 || 3rd Tier I West Pacific Southwest || --
|-
|2009 || 4 || 4 || 0 || 12th Tier II || --
|-
|2010* || 1 || 7 || 0 || 3rd Tier II West Pacific West || --
|-
!Totals || 22 || 18 || 0
|colspan="2"| 

* = Current Standing

Season schedule

2011

2010

External links
Southern California Breakers official website
IWFL official website

Independent Women's Football League
Sports in Fullerton, California
American football teams established in 2005
Women's sports in California
2005 establishments in California
American football teams in California